Events from the year 1691 in England.

Incumbents
 Monarchs – William III and Mary II
 Parliament – 2nd of William and Mary

Events
 April – John Tillotson enthroned as Archbishop of Canterbury.
 9 April – a fire at the Palace of Whitehall in London destroys its Stone Gallery.
 June – first performance of the semi-opera King Arthur with a libretto by John Dryden and music by Henry Purcell.
 3 September – HMS Coronation and HMS Harwich are lost in a storm while making for shelter in Plymouth Sound with 900 killed.
 18 September – War of the Grand Alliance: English and Dutch forces defeated by the French at the Battle of Leuze.
 3 October – the Treaty of Limerick ends the Williamite War in Ireland. The Flight of the Wild Geese – the departure of the Jacobite army – follows.

Births
 27 February – Edward Cave, editor and publisher (died 1754)
 29 September – Richard Challoner, Catholic prelate (died 1781)
 1 October – Arthur Onslow, politician (died 1768)

Deaths
 13 January – George Fox, founder of the Quakers (born 1624)
 17 January – Richard Lower, physician (born 1631)
 11 May – John Birch, soldier (born 1615)
 3 June – Tom Cox, "The Handsome Highwayman" (born c. 1666; hanged)
 10 September – Edward Pococke, Orientalist and biblical scholar (born 1604)
 9 October – William Sacheverell, statesman (born 1638)
 8 December – Richard Baxter, clergyman (born 1615)
 probable – Elizabeth Polwheele, playwright (born c. 1651)

References

 
Years of the 17th century in England